James Henry Kanicki (born December 17, 1941 in Bay City, Michigan) is a former American football defensive tackle in the National Football League for the Cleveland Browns and New York Giants.  He played college football at Michigan State University and was drafted in the second round of the 1963 NFL Draft.  Kanicki was also selected in the seventh round of the 1963 AFL Draft by the Buffalo Bills.

Jim Kanicki purchased the Arthur Louis Steel Company of Ashtabula, Ohio in 1985, and still maintains control of the business.

In 2012, the Cleveland Plain Dealer named Jim Kanicki one of the Cleveland Browns' 100 best all-time players.

1941 births
Living people
American football defensive tackles
Michigan State Spartans football players
Cleveland Browns players
New York Giants players
Players of American football from Michigan
Sportspeople from Bay City, Michigan